Sikandarpur is one of the 44 union councils, administrative subdivisions, of Haripur District in the Khyber Pakhtunkhwa province of Pakistan. It is located about 28 mi (or 45 km) North of Islamabad, the country's capital city.

References

Union councils of Haripur District